Parvedentulina is a genus of air-breathing land snails, terrestrial pulmonate gastropod mollusks in the subfamily Orthogibbinae  of the family Streptaxidae. 

94 species of Parvedentulina were known in 2002 although the majority of these species were described in 2002. An additional 6 new species of Parvedentulina were described in 2009, and a further 5 new species of Parvedentulina were described in 2010.

Distribution 
The genus Parvedentulina is endemic to Madagascar.

Description 
The shell of Parvedentulina is small. The spire is high. The shell has ribs on its surface. There are no teeth in the aperture.

Shells of Parvedentulina are similar to those of another streptaxid genus, Gulella.

Species
Species within the genus Parvedentulina include:
 
 Parvedentulina acutapex Emberton & Pearce, 2000
 Parvedentulina ambatomitatoae Emberton, 2002
 Parvedentulina ambatosorotrae Emberton, 2002
 Parvedentulina ambatovakiae Emberton, 2002
 Parvedentulina analamerae Emberton, 2002
 Parvedentulina andapae Emberton, 2002
 Parvedentulina andavakoerae Emberton, 2002
 Parvedentulina andriantanteliaeK. C. Emberton, Slapcinsky, C. A. Campbell, Rakotondrazafy, Andriamiarison & J. D. Emberton, 2010
 Parvedentulina andringitrae Emberton, 2002
 Parvedentulina anjanaharibei Emberton, 2002
 Parvedentulina anjansudae Emberton, 2002
 Parvedentulina antsahamadioae Emberton, 2002
 Parvedentulina apieostriata Emberton & Pearce, 2000
 Parvedentulina balambasia Emberton, 2002
 Parvedentulina bemarahae Emberton, 2002
 Parvedentulina benjamini
 Parvedentulina betamponae Emberton, 2002
 Parvedentulina betsiakae Emberton, 2002
 Parvedentulina bitika Emberton & Griffiths, 2009
 Parvedentulina celestinae Emberton, 2002
 Parvedentulina conspicua Emberton, 2002
 Parvedentulina crenulata Emberton, 2002
 Parvedentulina delicata Emberton, 2002
 Parvedentulina densagyra Emberton, 2002
 Parvedentulina devolia Emberton, 2002
 Parvedentulina distincta Emberton, 2002
 Parvedentulina elegans Emberton, 2002
 Parvedentulina setra Emberton & Pearce, 2000
 Parvedentulina farihiambonia Emberton, 2002
 Parvedentulina fenni Emberton, 2002
 Parvedentulina fortistriata Emberton, 2002
 Parvedentulina fotobohitrae Emberton, 2002
 Parvedentulina fragilis Emberton, 2002
 Parvedentulina fusiforma Emberton, 2002
 Parvedentulina glesi (Fischer-Piette, Blanc, Blanc & Salvat, 1994)
 Parvedentulina gracilis Emberton, 2002
 Parvedentulina hafa Emberton, 2002
 Parvedentulina hatairana Emberton, 2002
 Parvedentulina horonanladia Emberton, 2002
 Parvedentulina jeani K. C. Emberton, Slapcinsky, C. A. Campbell, Rakotondrazafy, Andriamiarison & J. D. Emberton, 2010 
 Parvedentulina josephinae Emberton, 2002
 Parvedentulina kelivitsika Emberton, 2002
 Parvedentulina kendrae Emberton & Griffiths, 2009 
 Parvedentulina lalina Emberton, 2002
 Parvedentulina lincolni Emberton & Griffiths, 2009
 Parvedentulina macroconspicua Emberton, 2002
 Parvedentulina magna Emberton, 2002
 Parvedentulina mahalevona Emberton, 2002
 Parvedentulina mahialamboensis Emberton & Pearce, 2000
 Parvedentulina mahitsia Emberton, 2002
 Parvedentulina malala Emberton, 2002
 Parvedentulina mamirapiratra Emberton, 2002
 Parvedentulina mananarae Emberton, 2002
 Parvedentulina mandenae Emberton, 2002
 Parvedentulina manja Emberton, 2002
 Parvedentulina manomboae Emberton, 2002
 Parvedentulina manomponae Emberton, 2002
 Parvedentulina maranitra Emberton, 2002
 Parvedentulina margostriata Emberton & Pearce, 2000
 Parvedentulina marojejyae Emberton, 2002
 Parvedentulina masoalae Emberton, 2002
 Parvedentulina metula (Crosse, 1881)
 Parvedentulina miaranoniae Emberton, 2002
 Parvedentulina michellae Emberton & Griffiths, 2009
 Parvedentulina mijanona Emberton, 2002
 Parvedentulina minidistincta Emberton, 2002
 Parvedentulina minutissima Emberton, 2002
 Parvedentulina miova Emberton & Griffiths, 2009
 Parvedentulina montana Emberton, 2002
 Parvedentulina morontsiraka Emberton, 2002
 Parvedentulina namorokae Emberton, 2002
 Parvedentulina ovatostoma Emberton & Pearce, 2000
 Parvedentulina parva Emberton, 2002
 Parvedentulina pascali Emberton, 2002
 Parvedentulina paulayiK. C. Emberton, Slapcinsky, C. A. Campbell, Rakotondrazafy, Andriamiarison & J. D. Emberton, 2010 
 Parvedentulina pearcei Emberton, 2002
 Parvedentulina planapex Emberton, 2002
 Parvedentulina puichella Emberton, 2002
 Parvedentulina pyramida Emberton, 2002
 Parvedentulina ranomafanae Emberton, 2002
 Parvedentulina rantovina Emberton, 2002
 Parvedentulina rapetoa Emberton, 2002
 Parvedentulina ravinamatia Emberton, 2002
 Parvedentulina rogeri Emberton & Pearce, 2000
 Parvedentulina sahantananae Emberton, 2002
 Parvedentulina saintjacqui  W. H. Turton, 1932
 Parvedentulina simeni (Fischer-Piette, Blanc, Blanc & Salvat, 1994)
 Parvedentulina simplex Emberton, 2002
 Parvedentulina soa Emberton & Griffiths, 2009
 Parvedentulina tendrombohitra Emberton, 2002
 Parvedentulina terakabe Emberton, 2002
 Parvedentulina texieri Emberton, 2002
 Parvedentulina thompsoniK. C. Emberton, Slapcinsky, C. A. Campbell, Rakotondrazafy, Andriamiarison & J. D. Emberton, 2010 
 Parvedentulina tsara Emberton, 2002
 Parvedentulina tsaratananae Emberton, 2002
 Parvedentulina tsaravintana Emberton, 2002
 Parvedentulina lsimahialamboensis Emberton, 2002
 Parvedentulina tsingia Emberton, 2002
 Parvedentulina tsipika Emberton, 2002
 Parvedentulina tsisubulina Emberton, 2002
 Parvedentulina tsotra Emberton, 2002
 Parvedentulina unescoae Emberton, 2002
 Parvedentulina vavalava Emberton, 2002
 Parvedentulina vitroni (Fischer-Piette. Blanc, Blanc & Salvat, 1994)
 Parvedentulina vonjena Emberton, 2002
 Parvedentulina sp. 1 sensu Emberton & Griffiths (2009)
 Parvedentulina sp. 2 sensu Emberton & Griffiths (2009)

References

 Emberton, K.C. & Pearce, T.A. (2000). Small, high-spired pulmonates from Mounts Mahermana, Ilapiry, and Vasiha, southeastern Madagascar, with description of a new genus, and with conservation statuses of 15 streptaxid species. The Veliger, 43: 126-153. Berkeley.

Streptaxidae